Tobacco vein mottling virus (TVMV) is a plant pathogenic virus of the family Potyviridae, first described in 1972. It is found in the United States in tobacco plants. It is spread between plants by aphids.

References

External links
ICTVdB - The Universal Virus Database: Tobacco vein mottling virus
Family Groups - The Baltimore Method

Viral plant pathogens and diseases
Potyviruses